The 2019 College Nationals is the 24th Men's and Women's College Nationals.  The College Nationals is a team handball tournament to determined the College National Champion from 2019 from the US.

Final ranking

Men's ranking

Women's ranking

References

External links
 Tournament Results
 Second Page

USA Team Handball College Nationals by year
North Carolina Tar Heels team handball